The 2019 Mubadala World Tennis Championship was a non-ATP/WTA-affiliated exhibition tennis tournament. It was the 12th edition of the Mubadala World Tennis Championship with the world's top players competing in the event, held in a knockout format. The winner received $250,000 prize money. The event was held at the International Tennis Centre at the Zayed Sports City in Abu Dhabi, United Arab Emirates. It served as a warm-up event for the season, with the ATP World Tour beginning on January 3, 2020.

Rafael Nadal (world number 1) and Novak Djokovic (number 2) received byes to the semi-final.

Champions

Men's singles
  
 Rafael Nadal def.  Stefanos Tsitsipas 6–7(3–7), 7–5, 7–6(7–3)

Women's singles 
  Maria Sharapova def.  Ajla Tomljanović 6–4, 7–5

Players

Men's singles

Withdrawals 
Before the tournament
  Daniil Medvedev → replaced by  Karen Khachanov
  Gaël Monfils → replaced by  Andrey Rublev

Women's singles

References

External links
Official website

World Tennis Championship
2019 in Emirati tennis
World Tennis Championship
Mubadala World Tennis Championship